George Dominic Percy, Earl Percy (born 4 May 1984), is a British businessman and the heir apparent to the Dukedom of Northumberland.

Early life
Percy was born as the second child and elder son of Ralph Percy, 12th Duke of Northumberland and his wife, the former Jane Richard. He is a younger brother of Lady Katie Percy and an older brother of Lady Melissa Percy and Lord Max Percy. He became heir apparent to the dukedom in October 1995, when his uncle Henry, 11th Duke of Northumberland, died. Percy's parents, now Duke and Duchess of Northumberland, were eager to protect him from "vices and pitfalls", and they filed a lawsuit to prevent him from inheriting £1 million and a £350,000 annual income upon turning 18. In 1999, they succeeded in delaying the inheritance, which Percy received at the age of 25. Percy is also set to inherit Alnwick Castle.

Education and career
At the age of 12, Percy served as a page of honour to Elizabeth II at the 1996 State Opening of Parliament.

Percy was educated at Eton College, then studied geography at the University of Edinburgh, specialising in sustainable development and renewable energy. He graduated in 2007, having shared a house with Pippa Middleton, with whom he was subsequently linked.

Percy studied Arabic language at the University of Damascus, and later worked on development projects in the Middle East, including Abu Dhabi. He is the CEO of Hotspur Geothermal (formerly Cluff Geothermal), a British geothermal energy company, with Paul Younger as the Technical Director.

As old family friends, Percy and his family attended the wedding of Pippa Middleton's sister, Catherine, and Prince William, Duke of Cambridge, in 2011.

References 

1984 births
Living people
People educated at Eton College
Alumni of the University of Edinburgh
George Percy
Courtesy earls